No 279 Squadron RAF was a Royal Air Force air-sea rescue squadron of World War II. The squadron was formed on 16 November 1941 and disbanded on 10 March 1946.

History
No 279 Squadron was formed at RAF Bircham Newton on 16 November 1941. It was originally equipped with Lockheed Hudson fitted, from 1943, to carry Mark I airborne lifeboats. Detachments of the squadron were stationed at several RAF stations in the south-west of England between April 1942 and December 1943 to provide an air-sea rescue capability over the Bay of Biscay and Western Approaches.

In October 1944 No 279 Squadron was transferred to RAF Thornaby and re-equipped with Vickers Warwick aircraft. The squadron subsequently deployed detachments to RAF airfields in the north of Scotland to provide support to patrol and strike squadrons. Following the end of the war the Warwicks were replaced with Avro Lancasters in September 1945. These were flown until the squadron was disbanded on 10 March 1946 at RAF Beccles by being renumbered to No. 38 Squadron. A detachment had left in January 1946 for Pegu in Burma and upon arrival there around March was designated 1348 Air Sea Rescue Flight.

Aircraft operated

Squadron locations

References
Notes

Bibliography

 Bowyer, Michael J.F. and John D.R. Rawlings. Squadron Codes, 1937-56. Cambridge, UK: Patrick Stephens Ltd., 1979. .
 Delve, Ken. The Source Book of the RAF. Shrewsbury, Shropshire, UK: Airlife Publishing, 1994. .
 
 Flintham, Vic and Andrew Thomas. Combat Codes: A full explanation and listing of British, Commonwealth and Allied air force unit codes since 1938. Shrewsbury, Shropshire, UK: Airlife Publishing Ltd., 2003. .
 Halley, James J. The Squadrons of the Royal Air Force & Commonwealth, 1918-1988. Tonbridge, Kent, UK: Air Britain (Historians) Ltd., 1988. .
 Jefford, C.G. RAF Squadrons, a Comprehensive record of the Movement and Equipment of all RAF Squadrons and their Antecedents since 1912. Shrewsbury, Shropshire, UK: Airlife Publishing, 1988 (second edition 2001). .
 Lake, Alan. Flying Units of the RAF: The ancestry, formation and disbandment of all flying units from 1912. Shrewsbury, Shropshire, UK: Airlife Publishing, 1999. .
 Rawlings, John D.R. Coastal, Support and Special Squadrons of the RAF and their Aircraft. London: Jane's Publishing Company Ltd., 1982. .

External links

 RAF Bircham Newton
 Squadron histories for nos. 276–280 Squadron on RafWeb's Air of Authority - A History of RAF Organisation

279 Squadron
Aircraft squadrons of the Royal Air Force in World War II
Rescue aviation units and formations
Military units and formations established in 1941
Military units and formations disestablished in 1941